Aletha Louise Clough (born 24 June 1937) is a New Zealand former cricketer who played as an all-rounder, bowling right-arm medium and batting right-handed, as well as playing as a wicket-keeper in four matches. She appeared in one Test match for New Zealand in 1969. She primarily played domestic cricket for Otago, as well as playing one season for Auckland.

Her one Test match came against England at Basin Reserve, which was drawn. Clough bowled 22 overs, taking 1 wicket for 70 runs, dismissing Audrey Disbury caught.

References

External links
 
 

1937 births
Living people
People from Waitangi, Chatham Islands
New Zealand women cricketers
New Zealand women Test cricketers
Otago Sparks cricketers
Auckland Hearts cricketers